Ribeirão do Sul is a municipality in the state of São Paulo in Brazil. The population is 4,539 (2020 est.) in an area of 203 km2.

References

Municipalities in São Paulo (state)